Black Thorn may refer to:

Black Thorn (comics), a DC Comics character
Black Thorn (album), the fifth studio album by the Celtic punk band Flatfoot 56
Rogue Spear: Black Thorn, an add-on for the video game Tom Clancy's Rainbow Six: Rogue Spear
Member of the Circle of the Black Thorn, a fictional secret society in the television show Angel